The following private and parochial schools operate in Baltimore. Updated February 2022.

Notes and references 

Private and parochial schools
 
Baltimore